Eureka Roadhouse is a census-designated place (CDP) in the Matanuska-Susitna Borough in the U.S. state of Alaska. It is part of the Anchorage Metropolitan Area. The population was 24 at the 2020 census.

Geography
Eureka Roadhouse is located between the CDPs of Glacier View and Nelchina on the Glenn Highway (Alaska Route 1), between the Chugach Mountains to the north and the Talkeetna Mountains to the southeast. The northern part of the CDP is occupied by the Nelchina Public Use Area.

Demographics

As of the census of 2010, there were 29 people, 16 households, and 6 families residing in the CDP. The population density was 0.15 people per square mile (0.06/km2). The racial makeup of the CDP was 22 (75.86%) White, 0 (0.0%) Black or African American, 2 (6.9%) Native American, 1 (3.4%) Asian, 0 (0.0%) from other races, and 4 (13.8%) from two or more races. 2 (6.9%) of the population were Hispanic or Latino of any race.

There were 101 housing units, of which 16 were occupied. Of the 16 households, 3 (18.8%) had children under the age of 18 living with them, 5 (31.3%) were married couples living together, 1 (6.3%) had a female householder with no husband present, and 10 (62.5%) were non-families. 9 (56.3%) of all households were made up of individuals, and 6 (35.5%) had someone living alone who was 65 years of age or older. The average household size was 1.81 and the average family size was 2.83.

In the CDP, the population was spread out, with 5 (17.1%) under the age of 18, 2 (6.9%) from 18 to 24, 3 (10.2%) from 25 to 44, 11 (37.8%) from 45 to 64, and 8 (27.5%) who were 65 years of age or older. The median age was 53.3 years. For every 100 females, there were 222.2 males (20 males, 9 females). For every 100 females age 18 and over, there were 200 males (16 adult males, 8 adult females).

Income data was not present for Eureka Roadhouse.

References

Anchorage metropolitan area
Census-designated places in Alaska
Census-designated places in Matanuska-Susitna Borough, Alaska